Glænø is a small Danish island off the west coast of Zealand between Basnæs Nor and Karrebæksminde Bugt. Agriculture is the island's main source of income and there are several farms at the centre of the island. Glænø has a sandy beach, a bird sanctuary and offers opportunities for walking and angling.

See also
List of islands of Denmark

References

Islands of Denmark
Geography of Slagelse Municipality